Ağlasun (from Greek Αγαλασσός Agalassos, in turn from Koine Greek Σαγαλασσός Sagalassos, in turn from Hittite Salawassa) is a town in Burdur Province in the Mediterranean region of Turkey. It is the seat of Ağlasun District. Its population is 3,645 (2021). The mayor is Ali Ulusoy (AKP).

The town is 7 km from the ruins of the ancient city of Sagalassos, from which it gets its modern name.

With its rich architectural heritage, Ağlasun is a member of the Norwich-based European Association of Historic Towns and Regions.

See also
Sagalassos

References

External links
 Beyaz Arif Akbas: Sagalassos: City of Fairies, Adrianapolis, Yalnizgoz Yay. 2010, . http://en.calameo.com/read/0002983841c7acaa28dc8

Ancient Greek archaeological sites in Turkey
Populated places in Ağlasun District
Towns in Turkey